The 12th FINA World Junior Synchronised Swimming Championships was held August 9–15, 2010 in Indianapolis, USA. The synchronised swimmers are aged between 15 and 18 years old, from 25 nations, swimming in four events: Solo, Duet, Team and Free combination.

Participating nations
25 nations swam at the 2010 World Junior Championships were:

Results

References

FINA World Junior Synchronised Swimming Championships
2010 in synchronized swimming
Swimming
International aquatics competitions hosted by the United States
2010 in sports in Indiana
Swimming competitions in Indiana
Synchronized swimming competitions in the United States